The Billboard Music Award winners for Top Streaming Song (Video):

Multiple awards and nominations

Wins
2 wins
 Justin Bieber

Nominations

3 nominations 
 Taylor Swift
 Bruno Mars

2 nominations 
 Miley Cyrus
 LMFAO
 Macklemore & Ryan Lewis
 Justin Bieber
 Eminem

References

Billboard awards